Novy Beltir (Ĵañı Beltir) is a rural locality (a selo) and the administrative centre of Beltirskoye Rural Settlement, Kosh-Agachsky District, the Altai Republic, Russia. The population was 1,248 as of 2016. There are 23 streets.

Geography 
Novy Beltir is located 10 km southwest of Kosh-Agach (the district's administrative centre) by road. Kosh-Agach is the nearest rural locality.

References 

Rural localities in Kosh-Agachsky District